The 1976 Big Sky Conference men's basketball tournament was held  at the Wildcat Gym at Weber State College in  This was the first edition of the tournament.

Format
The Big Sky had eight members for the 1975–76 season, but only the top four teams from the standings qualified for the tournament, and the regular season champion was the host. This format was in place for the first eight editions,  

This was the thirteenth year of the conference and the ninth season in which the Big Sky champion had an automatic berth in the NCAA tournament, all in the West regional.  Two years earlier, a one-game tiebreaker playoff was required to determine  also won by the 

The seeding of the three co-champions for the four-team bracket was done by a random draw in late February, conducted via a Saturday night conference telephone call by commissioner John Roning from Moscow, Idaho. Weber was drawn as the top seed, which included the right to host at Wildcat Gym in Ogden, Utah. At this time, both Weber and Boise still played in small gymnasiums, while ISU's Minidome had about triple the seating capacity of the others.

Bracket

References

Big Sky Conference men's basketball tournament
Tournament
Big Sky Conference men's basketball tournament
Big Sky Conference men's basketball tournament
Basketball competitions in Ogden, Utah
College sports tournaments in Utah